Nodaria nodosalis is a species of moth of the family Erebidae. It is found in tropical Africa, Yemen, Oman, North Africa, Portugal, southern France, Italy, Albania, Bulgaria, Greece, Lebanon and Israel.

In Mediterranean Basin there are two generations per year. In the subtropics and tropics there are multiple generations.

The larvae feed on Ipomoea and Lactuca species.

External links

Fauna Europaea
Lepiforum.de

Herminiinae
Moths of Europe
Moths of Asia
Moths of the Middle East
Moths described in 1851
Taxa named by Gottlieb August Wilhelm Herrich-Schäffer